Osni Purificação Neto (born April 16, 1979) is a Brazilian retired soccer player who played as a midfielder. He also played at the international level with the Brazil national under-20 football team.

Playing career

Brazil 
Neto began his career in 1998 with SE Palmeiras where he assisted the team in winning the 1998 Copa do Brasil against Cruzeiro. Shortly after he signed with Clube do Remo where he won the Campeonato Paraense state title in 1999. He returned to his former club Palmeiras in 2001 where he had several loan spells with various clubs throughout his tenure. His first loan spell was with Coritiba followed by Santa Cruz in 2002, and with Mogi Mirim in 2003. 

In 2004, he played abroad in the Sudan Premier League with Al-Merrikh SC. After a season in Sudan, he returned to Brazil to sign with Vasco da Gama. He only appeared in two matches with Vasco and shortly after signed with Inter de Limeira in the Campeonato Paulista. 

After pursuing his career in North America for three years he returned to Brazil in 2009 to play with Esporte Clube São Bento and Tocantins Futebol Clube.

North America  
He continued his career in the United States and had a trial match with the MetroStars. He would ultimately land a contract in the USL First Division with the Toronto Lynx in 2006. He made his debut for Toronto on April 29, 2006, against Vancouver Whitecaps. He would later record his first goal for Toronto in a 2-1 defeat to Portland Timbers on May 21, 2006. In his debut season with Toronto, he appeared in 26 matches and recorded five goals. He also helped Toronto in reaching the 2006 Open Canada Cup final where they were defeated by Ottawa St. Anthony Italia. 

After the relegation of the Toronto Lynx to the USL Premier Development League in 2007, he played in the Canadian Soccer League with the Serbian White Eagles. During his time with the Eagles, he appeared in sixteen games and scored 5 goals. In late 2007, he was drafted by the New Jersey Ironmen in the Major Indoor Soccer League expansion draft. He ultimately signed a contract with the club. In his debut season in indoor soccer, he appeared in 16 matches and scored five goals. After the conclusion of the season, he was waived from his contract in 2008.

International career 
He played with the Brazil national under-20 football team.

References 

1979 births
Living people
Brazilian expatriate footballers
Brazilian expatriate sportspeople in Canada
Brazilian expatriate sportspeople in the United States
Brazilian footballers
Canadian Soccer League (1998–present) players
CR Vasco da Gama players
Expatriate soccer players in Canada
Expatriate soccer players in the United States
Association football forwards
New Jersey Ironmen (MISL) players
Footballers from São Paulo
Serbian White Eagles FC players
Sociedade Esportiva Palmeiras players
Toronto Lynx players
USL First Division players
Major Indoor Soccer League (2001–2008) players
Clube do Remo players
Coritiba Foot Ball Club players
Santa Cruz Futebol Clube players
Mogi Mirim Esporte Clube players
Al-Merrikh SC players
Associação Atlética Internacional (Limeira) players
Esporte Clube São Bento players
Tocantins Futebol Clube players
Sudan Premier League players